Hans Dulfer (born 28 May 1940) is a Dutch jazz musician who plays tenor saxophone.

Life and music 

Hans Dulfer was born on 28 May 1940 in Amsterdam, Netherlands. He began at age 17 and has been referred to as "Big boy" because of his album of the same name. At the end of the sixties he and Herbert Noord (Hammond organ) founded a quartet that played saxophone/organ funk. He has performed a considerable amount of cross-over jazz and jazz fusion and has also worked with Punk rockers. He has recorded an album with saxophonist Frank Wright titled "El Saxofón". He has comparatively high popularity in Japan where Hyperbeat was a top-selling CD by instrumental standards. Furthermore, Japanese film maker Masaaki Yuasa stated that he listened to Hans Dulfer's music while working on Mind Game.

Hans Dulfer is the father of saxophonist Candy Dulfer and the two worked together on the album Dulfer & Dulfer.

Discography
 The Morning After the Third (Catfish, 1970)
 Candy Clouds (Catfish, 1970)
 El Saxofon (Catfish, 1971)
 Maine with Roswell Rudd  (BV Haast, 1977)
 I Didn't Ask (Varajazz, 1981)
 Big Boy (Monsters of Jazz, 1994)
 Express Delayed (Limetree, 1995)
 Dig! (Monsters of Jazz, 1996)
 Papa's Got a Brand New Sax (EMI, 1998)
 Skin Deep (EMI, 1998)
 El Saxofon Part II (EMI, 2000)
 Dulfer & Dulfer (Eagle, 2002)
 Scissors (JJ-Tracks, 2003)
 Duo Dulfer Directie (Zip, 2018)

As sideman
With Theo Loevendie
 Mandela (Catfish, 1970)
 Chess! (BASF 1972)
 Theo Loevendie 4tet (Universe 1974)
 Orlando (Waterland 1977)

With others
 Susanne Alt, Saxify (Venus 2016)
 Willem Breuker, Contemporary Jazz from Holland Litany for the 14th of June 1966 (Relax 1966)
 Herman Brood, Hooks (CBS, 1989)
 Claw Boys Claw, Hitkillers (Megadisc, 1988)
 Jules Deelder, De Deeldeliers (Embrace, 2012)
 Defunkt, Allergy for the U.S. (Defunkt Music 2014)
 Candy Dulfer, What Does It Take (N-Coded/Warlock/BMG, 1999)
 Candy Dulfer, Live in Amsterdam (Ariola, 2001)
 Saskia Laroo, It's Like Jazz (Laroo 1994)
 Saskia Laroo, Jazzdance (Laroo 1996)
 Lils Mackintosh, Black Girl (Quintessence, 1999)
 Masayoshi Takanaka, Guitar Wonder (Eastworld, 1996)
 Hallo Venray, The More I Laugh the Hornier Due Gets! (Van, 1992)
 Henk Westbroek, Vrij (Columbia, 1994)

References

External links

 Hans Dulfer (official website)
 Hans Dulfer (official Japanese website)

1940 births
Dutch jazz saxophonists
Male saxophonists
Jazz tenor saxophonists
Living people
Musicians from Amsterdam
21st-century saxophonists
21st-century male musicians
Male jazz musicians